The Dean of Liverpool is based in Liverpool and is head of the chapter of Liverpool Cathedral.

Sue Jones was installed as Dean on 5 May 2018. A former dean, Edward Patey, said that being Dean of Liverpool was "the best job in the Church of England".

List of deans
1931–1955: Frederick Dwelly
1956–1963: Frederick Dillistone
1964–1983: Edward Patey
1983–1999: Derrick Walters
2000–2007: Rupert Hoare
2007–2011: Justin Welby (became Bishop of Durham, then Archbishop of Canterbury)
15 September 20125 June 2017: Pete Wilcox (became Bishop of Sheffield)
5 May 2018present: Sue Jones

References

 
Anglican Diocese of Liverpool
Liverpool Anglican Cathedral